Robert Thomas Letterman (born October 31, 1970) is an American film director and screenwriter.

Letterman made his directorial debut as co-director of the animated comedy film Shark Tale (2004), for which he received a nomination for the Annie Award for Writing in a Feature Production. He then co-directed the animated science fiction comedy film Monsters vs. Aliens (2009).

Letterman has since transitioned into live-action filmmaking, directing the fantasy comedy film Gulliver's Travels (2010), the horror comedy film Goosebumps (2015), and the fantasy mystery film Pokémon Detective Pikachu (2019).

In 2020, Netflix announced Letterman as director for an upcoming live-action animated film adaptation of Ubisoft's Beyond Good & Evil video game.

Early life
Letterman was born in Hawaii and attended Mid-Pacific Institute and USC.

Career
Prior to joining DreamWorks Animation, Letterman directed the short film Los Gringos, which was accepted at 2000's Sundance Film Festival.

In 2002, Vicky Jenson and Eric "Bibo" Bergeron involved him as a screenwriter (then as co-director) in the making of Shark Tale. 
In 2010, Letterman directed the live-action film Gulliver's Travels, starring Jack Black in the lead role. He also directed the live-action/CGI film Pokémon Detective Pikachu, based on the Pokémon videogame franchise. The film was released on May 10, 2019, and grossed $433 million at the box office as well as attained the highest percentage of positive reviews on Rotten Tomatoes for a film adaptation of a video game.

Personal life
Letterman is in a relationship with Beth Pontrelli and has two children, Jack and Eva.

Filmography
Film

Television

Other credits

References

External links
 

Living people
American film directors
American male screenwriters
People from Hawaii
DreamWorks Animation people
1970 births